Stephanie Braxton (born December 11, 1944, in Boston, Massachusetts) is an American television writer, playwright and actress. She married Dan Hamilton in 1976 after meeting him when they were both appearing on The Secret Storm.  They later appeared together on All My Children.  Her character on The Edge of Night, Winter Austen, murdered his character, Wade Meecham.  They are now divorced. She is the stepmother of Josh Hamilton.  (Josh Hamiliton played her step-son on All My Children.)

Acting credits
Love Is a Many Splendored Thing (Blind student)
The Secret Storm (Laurie Hollister Stevens Reddin #2)
All My Children (Tara Martin#2)
The Edge of Night (Winter Austen #2)
Quincy M.E. (Donna)
Eight is Enough (Doris)
Dallas (Alisha Ogden)
King's Crossing (Carol Hadary)
Hill Street Blues (Fowler)
The Jeffersons (Leontyne Farrell)
The Lilac Papers (Jean)
Caught in the Act (Herself)

Writing credits
One Life to Live
Guiding Light
Search for Tomorrow (co-head writer with Paul Avila Mayer)
General Hospital (hired by Claire Labine)
As the World Turns (Hired by Douglas Marland)

Awards and nominations
Daytime Emmy Awards

WINS 
(1995; Best Writing; General Hospital)
(2001; Best Writing; As the World Turns)

NOMINATIONS 
(1985; Best Writing; Guiding Light)
(1989, 1991 & 1993; Best Writing; As the World Turns)

Writers Guild of America Award

WINS 
(1995 & 1996 seasons; General Hospital)

NOMINATIONS 
(1985 & 2002 seasons; Guiding Light)
(1990 season; As the World Turns)
(1997 season; General Hospital)

External links

www.more.com
www.hbstudio.org
www.hbplaywrights.org
www.nyfilmvideo.com
www.prweb.com
www.soap-news.com

1944 births
Living people
American soap opera writers
American television actresses
Writers from Boston
Actresses from Boston
American women dramatists and playwrights
20th-century American actresses
21st-century American actresses
American women television writers
Screenwriters from Massachusetts
Women soap opera writers